Pietro Genovesi (27 June 1902 – 5 August 1980) was an Italian association footballer who played as a midfielder. He competed in the 1928 Summer Olympics. and the 1927-30 Central European International Cup.

International career
Genovesi was a member of the Italy national team that won the bronze medal in the 1928 Olympic football tournament, and the team that won the 1927-30 Central European International Cup.

Honours

Club
Bologna
Italian Football Championship: 1924–25, 1928–29

International 
Italy
 Central European International Cup: 1927-30
 Olympic Bronze Medal: 1928

References

External links
Profile at Enciclopediadelcalcio.it
profile

1902 births
1980 deaths
Italian footballers
Footballers at the 1928 Summer Olympics
Olympic footballers of Italy
Olympic bronze medalists for Italy
Italy international footballers
Olympic medalists in football
Bologna F.C. 1909 players
Medalists at the 1928 Summer Olympics
Association football midfielders
Bologna F.C. 1909 managers
Italian football managers